Arvindah Luxman Kandappah (born 7 March 1971) is a Sri Lankan-born Canadian cricketer. He is a right-handed middle order batsman.

Kandappah started his international career well, scoring 69 not out against Kenya on his One Day International debut, and 87 against the same opponent in his maiden first class match.

References

1971 births
Living people
Canadian cricketers
Canada One Day International cricketers
Canadian people of Sri Lankan Tamil descent
Canadian Hindus
Canadian sportspeople of Sri Lankan descent
Sri Lankan emigrants to Canada
Cricketers from Colombo
Sri Lankan cricketers